Carlo Trotti (died 27 September 1612) was a Roman Catholic prelate who served as Bishop of Bagnoregio (1598–1612).

Biography
On 9 October 1598, Carlo Trotti was appointed during the papacy of Pope Clement VIII as Bishop of Bagnoregio. He served as Bishop of Bagnoregio until his death on 27 September 1612. While bishop, he was the principal co-consecrator of Camillo Beccio, Bishop of Acqui.

References

External links and additional sources
 (for Chronology of Bishops) 
 (for Chronology of Bishops) 

16th-century Italian Roman Catholic bishops
17th-century Italian Roman Catholic bishops
Bishops appointed by Pope Clement VIII
1612 deaths